

Apadmi is an independent technology company based in Manchester. Specialising in mobile, Apadmi works with clients including Argos, the BBC, Co-op, the Guardian, NHS, Lexus, Range Rover, and United Utilities.

History 
Apadmi was founded in 2009 by mobile industry experts: Garry Partington (Chief Executive Officer), Nick Black (Chief Commercial Officer), Adam Fleming (Chief Technical Officer) and Howard Simms (CEO of Apadmi Ventures), who in 2018 received an honorary Doctorate in Technology from Manchester Metropolitan University.

As of 2020, the company has 150+ employees (excluding Ventures). Their Headquarters are in Old Trafford, Manchester, with additional offices in Manchester city centre and London.

The team is composed of software engineers, test analysts, project managers, business development managers, account managers, and UX designers, amongst many other positions. Apadmi also employs a number of graduates, interns, and apprentices.

Business structure 
The different arms of the business operate on three core principles: to create, innovate and invest. The core Apadmi business creates technology with a focus on mobile, including application development for iOS and Android devices through to skills for Amazon Alexa.

Apadmi Ventures, the investment arm, is a strategic technical partner and investor in highly-scalable start-ups, providing technology direction and delivery, as well as boardroom advice and support to accelerate growth. Their investments include RealityMine, Bidooh, JigTalk, FLYT, and Beatstream.

Apadmi Labs is the research and development arm of the Apadmi group. They discover new technologies and methodologies to create new processes, services, and products.

Awards
 2018 UK App Awards, Large UK App Agency of the Year 
 2018 MPA Awards, Large Digital Agency of the Year
 2018 MPA Awards, Best Digital Agency Campaign (with the My Argos Card)
 2018 Utility Week Awards, Customer Engagement Award (with the United Utilities app)
 2018 UK Agency Awards, Large Digital Agency of the Year
 2018 Northern Digital Awards, Large Digital Agency of the Year
 2018 Top UK App Developers, Clutch

See other awards here.

Services 
 Mobile app development
 System architecture and design
 Server development
 User experience (UX) design
Service design
 User interface expertise
 User testing and discovery
 Customer research
 Voice technology
 Internet of Things
 Analytics and Big Data
 AR/VR
 Machine learning
 Mobile strategy and roadmapping
 Media research technology
Advertising technology

References

External links
 

Software companies of the United Kingdom
Mobile software development
Companies established in 2009
Business software companies
Companies based in Manchester
2009 establishments in the United Kingdom